The Ottawa Gaels Gaelic football Club is a  Gaelic Athletic Association club in Ottawa dedicated to the promotion and development of Gaelic football in the Canadian capital. The club was established in 1975.

The club is affiliated with the Toronto GAA division, in which it fields teams in both men's and ladies senior competitions. In the Toronto GAA leagues, the Ottawa Gaels club competes against other teams from Toronto, Ottawa, and Montreal in a season which runs from May to September.

External links
 Ottawa Gaels Website

Gaelic games clubs in Canada
Ga